

Incumbents
 Emperor of India – George V
 Viceroy of India – Charles Hardinge, 1st Baron Hardinge of Penshurst

Events
 National income - 13,313 million
 Mohandas Karamchand Gandhi returns to India from South Africa to spearhead the Indian independence movement.
 Calcutta School of Music is established by Phillpe Sandre.
The Home Rule League is founded by Annie Besant (it was formally launched in 1916).

Law
Sir Jamsetjee Jejeebhoy Baronetcy Act
 Banaras Hindu University Act
Government Of India Act

Births
6 March – Syedna Mohammed Burhanuddin, religious head (died 2014).
11 March – Vijay Hazare, cricketer (died 2004).
26 July – Sri K. Pattabhi Jois, yoga teacher (died 2009).
15 August – Ismat Chughtai, writer (died 1991).
31 August – Mir Ali Ahmed Khan Talpur Prominent political figure and former Federal Minister for defense Government of Pakistan (died 1987 in london)

Full date unknown
M. F. Husain, artist.

Deaths
19 February – Gopala Krishna Gokhale, politician
05 November - Pherozeshah Mehta, politician

References

 
India
Years of the 20th century in India